Lut or LUT may refer to:

Businesses and organisations
 LUT University, Finland
 Loughborough University of Technology, now Loughborough University, England
 London United Tramways (1894–1933), UK

Places
 Lut, Iran, a village in Amol County, Mazandaran Province
 Lut, Sari, or Lowlet, a village in Sari County, Mazandaran Province, Iran
 Dasht-e Lut, a desert in southeastern Iran

Other uses
 Lot in Islam, known as Lot in the Old Testament, a prophet of God in the Quran
 Lut, a tributary of the Danube in Mehedinți County, Romania
 Luț, a tributary of the river Mureș in Transylvania, Romania
 Łut, a Polish unit of measurement
 LÜT, a segment of YouTube channel Vsauce
 Lushootseed language, ISO 639 code lut
 Luton railway station, England, station code LUT 
 Lookup table, in computer science
 3D lookup table, in image processing
 Lut, program steering in World War II torpedoes of Germany
 Local User Terminal of the international Cospas-Sarsat Programme satellite system

See also

 Luts (disambiguation)